Cyperus rupestris is a species of sedge that is native to south eastern parts of Africa and a small area of Asia.

The species was first formally described by the botanist Carl Sigismund Kunth in 1837.

See also
 List of Cyperus species

References

rupestris
Plants described in 1837
Taxa named by Carl Sigismund Kunth
Flora of Vietnam
Flora of South Africa
Flora of Angola
Flora of Botswana
Flora of Malawi
Flora of Namibia